Epiactaea is a genus of crabs in the family Xanthidae, containing the following species:

 Epiactaea bullifera (Alcock, 1898)
 Epiactaea margaritifera (Odhner, 1925)
 Epiactaea nodulosa (White, 1848)

References

Xanthoidea